The International Commission of Human Rights Experts on Ethiopia (ICHREE) was established by the UN Human Rights Council in December 2021. The mandate of the commission is to investigate allegations of violations and abuses of international human rights law, humanitarian law and refugee law in Ethiopia committed since 3 November 2020 by all parties to the conflict. The Commission comprises three human rights experts and is appointed for a renewable one-year term.

Creation and aims 
On 3 November 2021, the report of the joint investigation undertaken by the UN High Commissioner for Human Rights and the Ethiopian Human Rights Commission indicated that serious human rights violations had continued to be committed by all parties in a number of regions of Ethiopia since the end of the period under investigation, i.e. after the unilateral ceasefire declared by the Ethipian government on 28 June 2021; hence the need for further investigations.

On 17 December 2021, the United Natiuins Human Rights Council reacted to that report by adopting resolution S-33/1. The resolution established the International Commission of Human Rights Experts on Ethiopia (ICHREE) with the aim of complementing the work of the joint investigative team. ICHREE's mandate includes conducting an impartial investigation into allegations of violations and abuses of international human rights law, humanitarian law and refugee law in Ethiopia committed since 3 November 2020 by all parties to the conflict, providing guidance on transitional justice, and making recommendations to the Government of Ethiopia while engaging with all relevant stakeholders.

In October 2022 the Human Rights Council renewed the mandate of ICHREE to continue to monitor and document crimes under international law and human rights violations.

Members and structure 
ICHREE is composed by three experts. As of December 2022, the members are Mohamed Chande Othman (Chair), Steven Ratner and Radhika Coomaraswamy. Former members are Kaari Betty Murungi (Chair) and Fatou Bensouda.

Actions 

On 19 September 2022 ICHREE submitted a report with its initial findings to the Human Rights Council. According to the report, there were grounds to believe that extrajudicial killings, sexual violence and starvation of the civilian population as a method of warfare had been committed in Ethiopia since 3 November 2020. The Commission concluded that, in many cases, these violations amount to war crimes and crimes against humanity. Ethiopia’s UN ambassador, Taye Atske Selassie, said that the report was "incoherent and sketchy" and was intended to increase political pressures against his government.

See also 

 Ethiopian Human Rights Commission
 EHRC–OHCHR Tigray investigation
 War crimes in the Tigray War
 Famine in the Tigray War
 Sexual violence in the Tigray War

References

External links 
 International Commission of Human Rights Experts on Ethiopia

Tigray War
Human rights in Ethiopia